"Dirty Dancer" is a song by Spanish singer Enrique Iglesias and American singer Usher, recorded for Iglesias' sixth studio album, Euphoria, and included on Usher's EP Versus.  A remix of the song, which features American rapper Lil Wayne and American singer Nayer,  was released on 9 May 2011 by Universal Music Group as the sixth single from Euphoria. Written by the two singers with Evan Bogart, Erika Nuri and David Quiñones and producer RedOne, "Dirty Dancer" is a dance-pop song.

The album version of "Dirty Dancer" appeared on the UK Singles Chart, the Dutch Single Top 100 and the Slovakian Radio Top 100 Oficiálna, while the single version entered the Australian Singles Chart, the New Zealand Singles Chart and the U.S. Billboard Hot 100. An Ethan Lader-directed music video for "Dirty Dancer" has the three artists watching holographic dancers in nightclubs. The single has already been certified Gold in Australia and USA. It was covered by the Dutch symphonic metal band Within Temptation as part of their weekly radio covers in promotion for their upcoming event, Elements and was included on their April 2013 cover album The Q-Music Sessions. The song samples parts of the 1995 song "Salva Mea" by Faithless.

Background
"Dirty Dancer" was written by Enrique Iglesias, RedOne, Evan Bogart, Erika Nuri and David Quiñones, and was produced by RedOne. It was recorded at South Point Studios, Miami. "Dirty Dancer" is a dance-pop song with some influences of electropop, dubstep, and rave music. According to Adam Graham of MTV News, "Dirty Dancer" is about "a comely-yet-dangerous female"; its hook features the lyrics "She's a dirty, dirty dancer/ Dirty, dirty dancer/ Never ever lonely". At the beginning on the song, Usher dedicates it to "the dirty girls all around the world". Iglesias and Usher exchange verses before, on the single remix, Wayne gives his rap verse, which makes a reference to actor Eddie Murphy. "Dirty Dancer" was included on Iglesias' sixth studio album, Euphoria, and Usher's EP Versus. "Dirty Dancer" was sent to Australian contemporary hit radio (CHR) and nights radio on 9 May, while the single remix was sent to US CHR 10 May. The single was released as a music download in North America on 12 June 2011, and was released in Europe and Oceania on 19 June.

Critical reception
Robert Copsey from Digital Spy and Allison Stewart from The Washington Post chose "Dirty Dancer" as one of the best tracks on Euphoria, with Stewart calling it "steamy". Prefix Magazines Wilson McBee criticized Wayne's appearance on the track, and wrote that the line "Ain't no money like young money" was his "weakest last line ever".

Chart performance

The album version of "Dirty Dancer" debuted at number 194 on the UK Singles Chart on 17 July 2010, and at number fifty-one on the Dutch Single Top 100, where it later peaked at number thirty-nine. The album version also entered the Slovakian Radio Top 100 Oficiálna at number ninety-four in May 2011, as well as appearing on the Belgian Ultratip charts of Flanders and Wallonia at numbers nine and thirty-six, respectively.

On 16 May 2011, the single version debuted on the Australian Singles Chart at number thirty-six, and on the Australian Dance Chart at number thirteen. It has since peaked at numbers twenty-four and nine, respectively. On the issue dated 28 May 2011, "Dirty Dancer" debuted at number nine on the U.S. Hot Digital Songs chart with 126,000 copies sold, and subsequently appeared at number eighteen on the Billboard Hot 100. The same day it entered the Canadian Hot 100 at number eighteen. On 4 June 2011, "Dirty Dancer" debuted at number thirty-three on the Pop Songs chart, and later peaked at number seventeen. "Dirty Dancer" entered the New Zealand Singles Chart at number twenty-two on 30 May 2011. On the Dutch Top 40, the song debuted at number thirty-one and peaked at number twenty-five, while on the UK Singles Chart, the single version of "Dirty Dancer" has reached number twenty-one. It entered the French Singles Chart at number ninety-nine on 11 June 2011.

On 12 August 2011, the song charted at #1 on the Billboard Hot Dance Club Songs making it his ninth #1 single on the chart. He is the only male artist in the chart's history to achieve this milestone, beating previous record-holder Michael Jackson. It is his third consecutive #1 on this chart from his album Euphoria, following "I Like It" and "Tonight (I'm Fuckin' You)".

Live performances
Enrique Iglesias first premiered "Dirty Dancer" live as part of a medley with "I Like It" that he performed on the tenth season of American Idol on 12 May 2011. For the performance, he wore blue jeans and a black leather jacket, which featured Usher and Lil Wayne appearing on video screens behind backing vocalists and a band. Initially, Iglesias was under a lone spotlight, before several green lasers beams lit the stage.

Music video
The music video for "Dirty Dancer" was directed by Yasha Malekzad, Jeff Dotson & Ethan Lader and premiered on 22 June 2011. It opens by showing a city during the night, and Iglesias making his way to a futuristic strip club, who then watches a holographic pole dancer performing a gymnastic routine while wearing a black latex outfit. Usher is shown donning black clothing and sings alone in a dark room. Throughout the video he alternates between reality and a holographic. Iglesias is shown in similar scenes, and at one point lowers his jacket to expose his blue luminous heart. Iglesias presses buttons on a remote control and the dancer is replaced by another, dressed in silver, who is in turn replaced by a gold bikini-clad dancer. Wayne begins his verse while being projected onto a building, while other shots show him in a dark room, similar to those of Usher. The dancer whom Iglesias watches leans in to kiss him but is replaced by a holographic message reading "credit expired". Sabrina Cognata of WNOW-FM wrote, "This video has everything. And I mean everything worth having." MTV Buzzworthy's Jenna Hally Rubenstein wrote, "If you want to be a baller, this video is how you do it." The video has been viewed over 137 million times.

Track listing
U.S. digital download
 "Dirty Dancer" (Single Version) (with Usher featuring Lil Wayne) – 4:05
 "Dirty Dancer" (Music Video)
 "Dirty Dancer" (Remix) (with Usher featuring Lil Wayne and Nayer) - 4:04

German CD single / UK digital download
 "Dirty Dancer" (Single Version) (with Usher featuring Lil Wayne) – 4:05
 "Dirty Dancer" (with Usher) – 3:35

Credits and personnel
Credits are adapted from the liner notes of "Dirty Dancer".

Recording
Recorded at South Point Studios, Miami, Florida.

Personnel
Enrique Iglesias – songwriter, vocals
Nadir Khayat (RedOne) – songwriter, producer, instrumentation, programming, vocal editing
Evan Bogart – songwriter
Erika Nuri – songwriter
David Quiñones – songwriter
Carlos Paucar – vocal editing, recording, engineering
Johnny "Sev" Severin – vocal editing
Usher – vocals
Lil Wayne – vocals

Charts and certifications

Album version

Single remix

Year-end charts

Certifications

Release history

See also
 List of number-one dance singles of 2011 (U.S.)

References

2011 singles
Dance-pop songs
Enrique Iglesias songs
Lil Wayne songs
Song recordings produced by RedOne
Songs written by Enrique Iglesias
Songs written by E. Kidd Bogart
Songs written by RedOne
Universal Republic Records singles
Usher (musician) songs
Songs written by Erika Nuri
Songs written by David Quinones
Songs about dancing